Winslow is a town in Patoka Township, Pike County, in the U.S. state of Indiana. The population was 864 at the 2010 census. It is part of the Jasper Micropolitan Statistical Area.

History
Winslow was laid out in 1837. The town was named after William Winslow Hathaway, son of an early settler. A post office has been in operation at Winslow since 1839.

The town's name is part of the namesake of the Algers, Winslow and Western Railway which operates within Pike County, and passes through the community.

Geography
Winslow is located at  (38.382302, -87.213849).

Climate
The climate in this area is characterized by hot, humid summers and generally mild to cool winters.  According to the Köppen Climate Classification system, Winslow has a humid subtropical climate, abbreviated "Cfa" on climate maps.

Demographics

2010 census
As of the census of 2010, there were 864 people, 333 households, and 241 families living in the town. The racial makeup of the town was 97.8% White, 0.1% African American, 0.6% Native American, 0.1% Asian, 0.1% from other races, and 1.3% from two or more races. Hispanic or Latino of any race were 2.1% of the population.

There were 333 households, of which 34.5% had children under the age of 18 living with them, 52.3% were married couples living together, 15.0% had a female householder with no husband present, 5.1% had a male householder with no wife present, and 27.6% were non-families. 24.3% of all households were made up of individuals, and 12.9% had someone living alone who was 65 years of age or older. The average household size was 2.57 and the average family size was 3.01.

The median age in the town was 38.6 years. 26.5% of residents were under the age of 18; 9.7% were between the ages of 18 and 24; 22.2% were from 25 to 44; 25.7% were from 45 to 64; and 15.9% were 65 years of age or older. The gender makeup of the town was 46.9% male and 53.1% female.

2000 census
As of the census of 2000, there were 881 people, 370 households, and 237 families living in the town. The racial makeup of the town was 98.18% White, 0.57% Native American, 0.68% Asian, and 0.57% from two or more races. Hispanic or Latino of any race were 1.59% of the population.

There were 370 households, out of which 28.4% had children under the age of 18 living with them, 47.3% were married couples living together, 11.4% had a female householder with no husband present, and 35.9% were non-families. 31.6% of all households were made up of individuals, and 16.2% had someone living alone who was 65 years of age or older. The average household size was 2.38 and the average family size was 2.96.

In the town, the population was spread out, with 25.3% under the age of 18, 9.1% from 18 to 24, 27.9% from 25 to 44, 20.7% from 45 to 64, and 17.0% who were 65 years of age or older. The median age was 38 years. For every 100 females, there were 98.0 males. For every 100 females age 18 and over, there were 94.7 males.

The median income for a household in the town was $28,672, and the median income for a family was $33,864. Males had a median income of $30,063 versus $19,259 for females. The per capita income for the town was $13,986. About 11.3% of families and 13.5% of the population were below the poverty line, including 18.1% of those under age 18 and 8.1% of those age 65 or over.

Education
Winslow has a public library, a branch of the Pike County Public Library.

Notable people
The town of Winslow was home to Richard "Dick" Farley and the town's main bridge bears his name. Farley was a basketball player for the Winslow Eskimos and went on to play for Indiana University and the Detroit Pistons. Richard Farley died in Terre Haute, Indiana in the 1970s of cancer.

References

External links

Towns in Indiana
Communities of Southwestern Indiana
Towns in Pike County, Indiana
Jasper, Indiana micropolitan area